Magnus Christensen (born 20 August 1997) is a Danish professional footballer who plays as a midfielder for Norwegian Eliteserien club Haugesund.

Club career

AaB
Christensen was born in Frederikshavn, Denmark. At the age of 13 - as a U13 player - he moved to AaB from Bangsbo Freja.

On 10 June 2016, 18-year old Christensen was promoted to the first team squad, signing his first full-time professional contract with AaB. A month later, on 24 July 2016, Christensen got his official debut for the club. Christensen started on the bench, but replaced Casper Sloth in the 70th minute in a 1–0 victory against Randers FC in the Danish Superliga. On 23 November 2016 AaB announced, that they had extended the contract with Christensen until the summer 2020.

Christensen quickly became a regular part of the team, why he also signed a new three-year deal with AaB in June 2019. However, in the 2020-21 season, he lost his starting spot on the team, and later also in October 2020, broke his hand in a reserve team game. In November 2020, Christen told Danish newspaper Nordjyske Stiftstidende, that he wanted to leave AaB, after playing only one minute of professional football from the beginning of the season to the month of November. In January 2021, he was rumored to Randers, but in the end, decided to stay at AaB, after a new manager arrived at the end of January 2021. After a total of 149 games for AaB, it was confirmed, that Christensen had left the club, as his contract came to an end in June 2022.

Haugesund
On 11 July 2022 it was confirmed, that Christensen had joined Norwegian Eliteserien club Haugesund on a free transfer, signing a deal until June 2025.

References

External links
 
 Magnus Christensen on DBU

Living people
1997 births
Danish men's footballers
Danish expatriate men's footballers
People from Frederikshavn
Association football midfielders
Danish Superliga players
AaB Fodbold players
FK Haugesund players
Denmark youth international footballers
Sportspeople from the North Jutland Region
Danish expatriate sportspeople in Norway
Expatriate footballers in Norway